James Robert "Jay" Graham (February 12, 1870 – February 18, 1950) was an American sport shooter who competed in the 1912 Summer Olympics in Stockholm, Sweden. He won gold medals in trap shooting and team clay pigeons. He turned professional soon after the 1912 Games.

References

External links

1870 births
1950 deaths
American male sport shooters
Trap and double trap shooters
Shooters at the 1912 Summer Olympics
Olympic gold medalists for the United States in shooting
Olympic medalists in shooting
Medalists at the 1912 Summer Olympics
19th-century American people
20th-century American people